General elections were held in the Northern Mariana Islands on 10 December 1977. Carlos S. Camacho of the Democratic Party was elected Governor, defeating Jose C. Tenorio of the Territorial Party. Camacho's running mate Francisco Ada became Lieutenant Governor after a win over Olympio T. Borja. Democratic Party candidate Edward Pangelinan was elected as the territory's member of the United States House of Representatives, defeating Juan T. Lizama of the Territorial Party.

Although it lost the elections for the main posts, the Territorial Party won the legislative election, taking five of the nine seats in the Senate and eight of the fourteen seats in the House of Representatives. Felicidad Ogumoro, who was elected to the House in Saipan, became the first woman elected to the islands' legislature.

Results

Senate

House of Representatives

Aftermath
The new legislature was sworn in on 9 January 1978 Lorenzo Guerrero was elected President of the Senate and Oscar Rasa Speaker of the House of Representatives.

References

Elections in the Northern Mariana Islands
1977 Northern Mariana Islands elections